Ericinium or Ereikinion was a town and polis (city-state) of Perrhaebia in ancient Thessaly, situated near the frontiers of Histiaeotis.

The existence of the town is attested by epigraphic evidence at least since the 4th century BCE. In the Roman-Seleucid War, in the year 191 BCE, it was taken from the Athamanians by the joint army commanded by the Roman Marcus Baebius Tamphilus and Philip V of Macedon.

Its location has been found at the modern village of Megalo Eleftherochori.

References

Populated places in ancient Thessaly
Former populated places in Greece
Perrhaebia
Cities in ancient Greece
Thessalian city-states